= Explorer Hop =

Toronto-based financial education company

- Industry: Education
- Founder: Hasina Lookman
- Headquarters: Toronto, Ontario, Canada
- Website: https://explorerhop.com/

Explorer Hop is a Toronto-based company that teaches children and teens financial literacy, money management, and entrepreneurship.

== History ==
Explorer Hop was founded in Toronto by Hasina Lookman, a former special consultant on trade and finance for the United Nations. The company was established after she observed that even graduates from top-tier institutions often lacked essential financial literacy skills.

== Products ==
Explorer Hop provides financial literacy and entrepreneurship programs for children. Its "money camp" covers the fundamentals of the stock market.

=== Educational impact ===
In 2021, Explorer Hop launched the Global Investment Challenge for kids. Veronika Kolarska, winner of the first challenge, increased her virtual portfolio from $30,000 to $99 million.
